Five-time defending champion Esther Vergeer defeated Aniek van Koot in the final, 6–0, 6–0 to win the women's singles wheelchair tennis title at the 2012 French Open. Vergeer lost no sets and just three games (all in the first set of her quarterfinal against Yui Kamiji) en route to the title, improving on her record from 2010.

Seeds
  Esther Vergeer (champion)
  Aniek van Koot (final)

Draw

Finals

References
Main Draw

Wheelchair Women's Singles
French Open, 2012 Women's Singles